Albéric de Montgolfier (born 6 July 1964) is a member of the Senate of France, representing the Eure-et-Loir department.  He is a member of The Republicans.

References
Page on the Senate website

1964 births
Living people
People from Neuilly-sur-Seine
French Roman Catholics
Union for a Popular Movement politicians
The Strong Right
French Senators of the Fifth Republic
Sciences Po alumni
Paris Dauphine University alumni
Paris 2 Panthéon-Assas University alumni
Senators of Eure-et-Loir
The Republicans (France) politicians
Politicians from Île-de-France
21st-century French lawyers